Probable G-protein coupled receptor 88 is a protein that in humans is encoded by the GPR88 gene.

G protein-coupled receptors